Sphingopyxis soli is a Gram-negative, aerobic, rod-shaped and motile  bacterium from the genus of Sphingopyxis which has been isolated from landfill soil from Pohang in Korea.

References

Sphingomonadales
Bacteria described in 2010